Kabardian, also known as , is a Northwest Caucasian language closely related to the Adyghe (West Circassian) language. Circassian nationalists reject the distinction between the two languages and refer to them both as "Circassian".

It is spoken mainly in parts of the North Caucasus republics of Kabardino-Balkaria and Karachay-Cherkessia (Eastern Circassia), and in Turkey, Jordan and Syria (the extensive post-war diaspora). It has 47 or 48 consonant phonemes, of which 22 or 23 are fricatives, depending upon whether one counts  as phonemic, but it has only 3 phonemic vowels. It is one of very few languages to possess a clear phonemic distinction between ejective affricates and ejective fricatives.

The Kabardian language has two major dialects: Kabardian and Besleney. Some linguists argue that Kabardian is only one dialect of an overarching Adyghe or Circassian language, which consists of all of the dialects of Adyghe and Kabardian together, and the Kabardians themselves most often refer to their language using the Kabardian term Adighabze ("Adyghe language"). Several linguists, including Georges Dumézil, have used the terms "eastern Circassian" (Kabardian) and "western Circassian" (Adyghe) to avoid that confusion, but both "Circassian" and "Kabardian" may still be found in linguistic literature. There are several key phonetic and lexical differences that create a reasonably well-defined separation between the eastern and the western Circassian dialects, but the degree to which the two are mutually intelligible has not yet been determined. The matter is also complicated somewhat by the existence of Besleney, which is usually considered a dialect of Kabardian but also shares many features with certain dialects of Adyghe.

Kabardian is written in a form of Cyrillic and serves as the literary language for Circassians in both Kabardino-Balkaria (where it is usually called the "Kabardian language") and Karachay-Cherkessia (where it is called the "Cherkess language").

Like all other Northwest Caucasian languages, Kabardian is ergative and has an extremely complex verbal system.

Since 2004, the Turkish broadcasting corporation TRT has maintained a half-an-hour programme a week in the Terek dialect of Kabardian.

Dialects
East Circassian
Kabardian
West Kabardian
Kuban
Kuban-Zelenchuk (Cherkess)
 Central Kabardian
Baksan (basis for the literary language)
Malka
 Eastern Kabardian
Terek
Mozdok
 North Kabardian
Mulka
Zabardiqa (1925 until 1991 Soviet Zaparika)
 Baslaney dialect

Phonology 

The phoneme written Л л is pronounced as a voiced alveolar lateral fricative  mostly by the Circassians of Kabardino and Cherkessia, but many Kabardians pronounce it as an alveolar lateral approximant  in diaspora. The series of labialized alveolar sibilant affricates and fricatives that exist in Adyghe  became labiodental consonants  in Kabardian, for example the Kabardian words мафӏэ  "fire", зэвы  "narrow", фыз  "wife" and вакъэ  "shoe" are pronounced as машӏо , зэжъу , шъуз  and цуакъэ  in Adyghe. Kabardian has a labialized voiceless velar fricative  which correspond to Adyghe , for example the Adyghe word "тфы" ( "five" is тху in Kabardian.

Consonants

 In some Kabardian dialects (e.g. For example, the Baslaney words "гьанэ"  "shirt" and "кӏьапсэ"   "rope" are pronounced in other Kabardian dialects as "джанэ"  and кӏапсэ .
 Consonants that exist only in borrowed words.

The glottalization of the ejective stops (but not fricatives) can be quite weak, and has been reported to often be creaky voice, that is, to have laryngealized voicing. Something similar seems to have happened historically in the Veinakh languages.

Vowels
Kabardian has a vertical vowel system.

The following allophones of the short vowels ,  appear:

According to Kuipers,
These symbols must be understood as each covering a wide range of sub-variants.  For example, i stands for a sound close to cardinal  in 'ji' "eight", for a sound close to English  in "kit" in the word x'i "sea", etc.  In fact, the short vowels, which are found only after consonants, have different variants after  practically every series defined as to point of articulation and presence or absence of labialization or palatalization, and the number of variants is multiplied by the influence of the consonant (or zero) that follows.

Most of the long vowels appear as automatic variants of a sequence of short vowel and glide, when it occurs in a single syllable:
 = 
 = 
 = 
 = 

This leaves only the vowel . Kuipers claims that this can be analyzed as underlying  when word-initial, and underlying  elsewhere, based on the following facts:
 occurs only in the plural suffix [ha], which does not occur word-initially.
 is the only word-initial vowel; analyzing it as  makes the language underlyingly universally consonant-initial.
Certain complications involving stress and morphophonemic alternations are dramatically simplified by these assumptions.

Halle finds Kuipers' analysis "exemplary". Gordon and Applebaum note this analysis, but also note that some authors disagree, and as a result prefer to maintain a phoneme .

In a later section of his monograph, Kuipers also attempts to analyze the two vowels phonemes  and  out of existence. Halle, however, shows that this analysis is flawed, as it requires the introduction of multiple new phonemes to carry the information formerly encoded by the two vowel phonemes.

The vowel  appears in some loan words; it is often pronounced .

This monophthongisation does not occur in all dialects.

The vowels  can have the semi-vowel  in front of it.

Orthography
The current Cyrillic alphabet is as follows. The preceding Latin alphabet was much like the one for Adyghe.

Grammar 

Kabardian, like all Northwest Caucasian languages, has a basic agent–object–verb typology, and is characterized by an ergative construction of the sentence.

Example
The following texts are excerpts from the official translations of the Universal Declaration of Human Rights in Kabardian and Adyghe, along with the original declaration in English.

References

Sources
Gordon, Matthew and Applebaum, Ayla. "Phonetic structures of Turkish Kabardian", 2006, Journal of the International Phonetic Association 36(2), 159-186.
Halle, Morris. "Is Kabardian a Vowel-Less Language?" Foundations of Language, Vol. 6, No. 1 (Feb., 1970), pp. 95–103.
Kuipers, Aert. "Phoneme and Morpheme in Kabardian", 1960, Janua Linguarum: Series Minor, Nos. 8–9. 's-Gravenhage: Mouton and Co.

External links

 
Adyga.org - Popular Circassian internet forum
Audio.Adyga.org - Virtual Circassian Dictionary
, Circassian, English, Turkish
A guide to North Caucasian languages
Kabardian (къэбэрдеибзэ) alphabet
Circassian language online lessons

 
Agglutinative languages
Northwest Caucasian languages
Languages of Georgia (country)
Languages of Russia
Languages of Turkey
Languages of Iraq
Kabardino-Balkaria
Karachay-Cherkessia
Subject–object–verb languages
Vertical vowel systems